Jose Villarreal (born September 10, 1993) is an American soccer player who currently plays as a forward. He has previously played for LA Galaxy and Orlando City in MLS, Cruz Azul in Liga MX and Las Vegas Lights in the USL Championship.

Club career

Youth career
Villarreal won the U.S. Soccer Development Academy U-17/18 championship with Pateadores during the 2010–2011 Development Academy season. Pateadores won the championship after defeating FC Dallas 2–1 with Villarreal scoring both goals.

LA Galaxy
On December 22, 2011, Villarreal signed with LA Galaxy as a Homegrown Player. Aged 17, he made his debut for LA Galaxy on July 15, 2012 against Portland Timbers, coming on in the 90th minute, replacing Robbie Keane. Villarreal scored for LA Galaxy on July 18, with a late long-range goal, to tie the game at 2–2 in only his second MLS match.

On March 30, 2013, Villarreal scored a stoppage-time goal against Toronto FC to earn a 2–2 draw for LA Galaxy. Villarreal’s goal was named the No. 1 play of the day on SportsCenter.

On December 20, 2013 Villarreal moved to Mexican club Cruz Azul on loan from the LA Galaxy for a year with an option to buy after the loan for the Mexican side. However, Villarreal never made a first team roster for Cruz Azul and he terminated his loan early following the collapse of Cruz Azul Hidalgo, the club's reserve team that competed in Ascenso MX with whom he played once.

On March 6, 2015 he scored the first goal of the MLS season in a 2–0 home win over the Chicago Fire.

On July 1, 2015 Villarreal scored the winner in the opening 10 minutes in the Fifth Round of the U.S. Open Cup against San Jose Earthquakes.

Orlando City
On December 27, 2017, Villarreal was traded by LA Galaxy to Orlando City SC in exchange for a third-round selection in the 2019 MLS SuperDraft. Villarreal made his Orlando City debut on June 2, 2018 against New York City FC. On November 27, 2018, Villarreal had his contract option declined by the club having only made 3 substitute appearances for the Lions in MLS.

Las Vegas Lights 
On May 29, 2019, Villarreal signed for the Las Vegas Lights FC for the remainder of the 2019 USL Championship season. He made his Lights FC debut in the 69th minute of a U.S. Open Cup match against Orange County FC.

Global F.C.
In January 2020, Villarreal signed for Philippines Football League club Global F.C.

Los Angeles Force
In 2022, Villarreal played for NISA club Los Angeles Force, making three appearances.

Central Valley Fuego
On June 30, 2022, Villarreal signed with USL League One side Central Valley Fuego.

International career
Villarreal has been capped for the United States at under-18, under-20 and under-23 level.

He competed at the 2013 CONCACAF U-20 Championship where he scored 3 goals and was named to the All-Tournament Team. The team lost the final 3-1 after extra time to hosts and defending champions Mexico. He then represented the United States at the 2013 FIFA U-20 World Cup.

Personal life
Villarreal was born in Inglewood, California to immigrant Mexican parents. His younger brother Jaime (born 1995) is also a professional soccer player.

Career statistics

Club

Honors
LA Galaxy
 MLS Cup: 2012, 2014

References

External links
 
 
 
 

1993 births
Living people
American soccer players
American people of Mexican descent
American expatriate soccer players
American expatriate sportspeople in the Philippines
Association football forwards
Central Valley Fuego FC players
Cruz Azul footballers
Expatriate footballers in Mexico
Global Makati F.C. players
Homegrown Players (MLS)
LA Galaxy II players
LA Galaxy players
Las Vegas Lights FC players
Los Angeles Force players
Major League Soccer players
National Independent Soccer Association players
Orlando City SC players
Soccer players from California
Sportspeople from Inglewood, California
USL Championship players
United States men's under-20 international soccer players
United States men's under-23 international soccer players
United States men's youth international soccer players
USL League One players